Waliullah, also spelled Valiullah, Valiollah is used as a male Muslim name and often a by-name, meaning 'Custodian of God'. Most prominently, this is an epithet of Ali ibn Abi Talib, the first Shia Imam and the fourth Rashidun Caliph. Frequent in the Persian influenced Islamic World; It may also refer to:

Shah Waliullah Dehlawi (1703–1762), Indian Islamic scholar and reformer
Valiollah Fallahi (1931–1981), Iranian general
Valiollah Khakdan (1923–1996), Azerbaijani-Iranian art director
Wali-ullah Abul-Mansur Khan, known as Ablai Khan (1711–1781), the ruler of the Kazakh Khanate 
Valiollah Seif (born 1952), Iranian banker
Syed Waliullah (1922–1971), Bangladeshi novelist, short-story writer and playwright
Valíyu'lláh Varqá (1884–1955), Iranian Bahá'í leader

See also
Muhammad al-Mahdi , the 12th Imam of Shia Muslims
 List of Arabic theophoric names

Arabic masculine given names